Amadou Traoré (born 7 March 2002) is a French professional footballer who plays as a winger for Sporting Kansas City II in the MLS Next Pro.

Club career 
Traoré signed his first professional contract on 28 May 2019, and made his professional debut for Bordeaux on 25 October 2020.

On 17 January 2023, Traoré signed with MLS Next Pro side Sporting Kansas City II.

International career
Born in France, Traoré is of Guinean descent. He is a former youth international for France.

Career statistics

References

External links

2002 births
Living people
Footballers from Paris
French footballers
Black French sportspeople
France youth international footballers
French sportspeople of Guinean descent
Association football wingers
Paris FC players
FC Girondins de Bordeaux players
Sporting Kansas City II players
Ligue 1 players
Championnat National 2 players
Championnat National 3 players